The 2013 Conference Premier play-off Final, known as the 2013 Blue Square Bet Premier play-off Final for sponsorship purposes, was a football match between Wrexham and Newport County on 5 May 2013 at Wembley Stadium in London. It was the eleventh Conference Premier play-off Final and the first ever Wembley Final to feature two teams from Wales.

After not having played in Wembley for 149 years the match represented the second time in the 2012–13 season for Wrexham who reached the final with a 5–2 aggregate win over Kidderminster Harriers following their appearance in the 2013 FA Trophy Final. The final also represented Newport County's second trip to Wembley in less than a year having played in the 2012 FA Trophy Final. Newport had beaten Grimsby Town 2–0 over two legs to reach the play-off final.

Newport County won the match 2–0 to secure promotion to League Two, re-entering the Football League after a 25-year absence. It was the first time in Conference history that a team had not conceded a single goal in the play-offs.

Whereas the players in the Wrexham team were new to the play-off final, the County team had seven players with previous play-off final experience: Alan Julian had featured for Stevenage Borough in the 2005 final. It was the second successive final for Aaron O'Connor who had featured for Luton Town in the 2012 final. Danny Crow had featured in both the 2009 final for Cambridge United and the 2011 final for Luton Town. It was the fourth final for Robbie Willmott who had featured for Cambridge United in 2009 and Luton Town in the 2011 and 2012 finals. Winning the final for a second time were Ismail Yakubu, Lee Minshull and Christian Jolley who were all part of the victorious Wimbledon team in the 2011 final.

Match

Summary
Both teams started the game nervously with Wrexham having the better of the opening exchanges. On 15 minutes Brett Ormerod saw an effort at goal dragged wide of the near post. A cross from Johnny Hunt in the 21st minute was met by Ormerod but his shot went over the bar. Towards the end of the first half Newport gained momentum with Christian Jolley's curled shot just wide of goal. The score remained 0–0 at half time.

In the second half Wrexham stepped up their game and nearly took the lead in the 59th minute when an initial shot from Andy Morrell was palmed by Lenny Pidgeley into the path of Ormerod who blasted over from six yards. Shortly afterwards Newport's Danny Crow was replaced with their leading goalscorer Aaron O'Connor. Wrexham's player-manager Morrell then replaced himself with Adrian Cieslewicz. As the game wore on both teams made further substitutions with Newport's Michael Flynn making way for Scott Donnelly in the 74th minute and Wrexham's Glen Little coming on for captain Dean Keates in the 80th minute.

As the game looked certain to go into extra time Jolley headed a warning shot just wide of goal in the 83rd minute. Wrexham failed to heed the warning and in the 86th minute a long up-field pass from Andy Sandell was headed backwards by Wrexham's David Artell into the path of Jolley who made no mistake in lifting it over the on-rushing Chris Maxwell and into the goal.

Wrexham replaced Jay Harris with Dele Adebola in the 89th minute and pushed every player up front, including goalkeeper Maxwell. They managed to force a number of corners in injury time but were caught on the break by Jolley who fed O'Connor. His initial left-footed shot was saved but he made no mistake with his right-footed follow-up to make the score 2–0 to County in the 4th minute of injury time. Two minutes later and the game was over.

Details

References

play-off Final 2013
2013
Play-off Final 2013
Play-off Final 2013
Con
Conference Premier play-off Final
National League play-off final
Events at Wembley Stadium